Elements Pt. 2 is the tenth studio album by power metal band Stratovarius, released on 4 November 2003 through Nuclear Blast. The album reached No. 4 on  the Finnish albums chart and its single, "I Walk to My Own Song", reached No. 9 on the Finnish singles chart.

"Know the Difference" track refers to Serenity Prayer in its refrain.

Critical reception

James Christopher Monger at AllMusic gave Elements Pt. 2 three stars out of five, describing it as "borrowing liberally" from Helloween's Keeper of the Seven Keys series, and praising the album's "inspired moments" which "succeed with bombast and Queensrÿche-like melodrama." He noted "Alpha & Omega", "Awaken the Giant", "Season's of Faith's Perfection" and "Liberty" as highlights, but remarked that the album "may disappoint some fans with its lack of epics and torch-heavy balladry".

Track listing

Vinyl edition

Personnel
 Stratovarius
Timo Kotipelto – lead vocals, arrangement
Timo Tolkki – guitar, arrangement, engineering, record producer
Jens Johansson – keyboards, arrangement
Jörg Michael – drums, arrangement
Jari Kainulainen – bass guitar, arrangement

 Additional credits
Veijo Laine – orchestral arrangement, choir arrangement, production (orchestra, choir)
Riku Niemi – orchestral arrangement, choir arrangement, conducting (Joensuu City Orchestra), production (orchestra, choir)
Mikko Karmila – engineering, mixing
Kuken Olsson – engineering (keyboard)
Pauli Saastamoinen – mastering

Chart performance

Album

Singles

References

External links
Elements Part2 at stratovarius.com

Stratovarius albums
Nuclear Blast albums
2003 albums
Concept albums
Sequel albums